Caio Henrique Oliveira Silva (born 31 July 1997), known as Caio Henrique, is a Brazilian footballer who plays for Ligue 1 side Monaco, either as a left-back or a midfielder.

Club career
Born in Santos, São Paulo, Caio joined Santos' youth setup in 2008, aged ten. On 1 February 2016, he was sold to Atlético Madrid, as his contract was due to expire.

Caio was promoted to the reserves ahead of the 2016–17 campaign, but spent the whole pre-season with the main squad. He made his senior debut on 28 August 2016, starting in a 1–0 Tercera División away win against Fútbol Alcobendas Sport.

Caio made his professional debut on 30 November 2016, starting in a 6–0 Copa del Rey away routing of CD Guijuelo. He would resume his appearances with the B-side, however.

On 3 April 2018, Caio returned to his home country after agreeing to a loan deal with Série A side Paraná, until December. 

He spent the 2019 season on loan at Fluminense, making 65 appearances and scoring twice. In January 2020, he joined Grêmio also on loan, making only five appearances for the side before the stoppage of football in Brazil due to concerns over the COVID-19 pandemic.

On 27 August 2020, Caio Henrique joined Ligue 1 club Monaco, signing a five-year contract with the principality club. On 15 January 2021, he provided a right-footed assist to his captain Wissam Ben Yedder who scored a header at Montpellier Hérault SC. On the 22nd matchday of the season, he again provided an assist to Kevin Volland with a subtle dip at FC Nantes.

His season was so successful that he even aroused the interest of Paris-Saint-Germain and Barcelona during the transfer window; despite this, he decided to stay at Monaco.

On 6 August 2021, in the opening match of the 2021–22 season, he provided an assist to Gelson Martins, who scored the first goal in Ligue 1. On September 26, he provided two assists to his captain Wissam Ben Yedder and Kevin Volland, for a 3-1 victory over Clermont Foot. He played his 50th game for Monaco in a 1–1 UEFA Europa League draw against Real Sociedad. 

On 3 April 2022, he delivered his tenth assist of the season against FC Metz for a 2–1 away victory.

International career
Caio Henrique is a youth international for Brazil, having played up to the Brazil U23s. In January 2021 he gained Spanish citizenship after years of residency while at Atlético Madrid, and expressed interest in representing the Spain national team.

Career statistics

References

External links

 Profile at the AS Monaco FC website
 
 
 
 

1997 births
Living people
Sportspeople from Santos, São Paulo
Brazilian footballers
Brazil under-20 international footballers
Spanish footballers
Brazilian emigrants to Spain
Association football midfielders
Paraná Clube players
Fluminense FC players
Grêmio Foot-Ball Porto Alegrense players
Segunda División B players
Tercera División players
Ligue 1 players
Atlético Madrid B players
Atlético Madrid footballers
AS Monaco FC players
Brazilian expatriate footballers
Brazilian expatriate sportspeople in Spain
Expatriate footballers in Spain
Brazilian expatriate sportspeople in Monaco
Expatriate footballers in Monaco